Tegula montereyi, common name the "Monterey tegula", is a species of sea snail, a marine gastropod mollusk in the family Tegulidae.

This is an Eastern Pacific Ocean species which was previously known as Chlorostoma montereyi. The specific epithet refers to Monterey, California.

Description
The height of the shell varies between 28–39 mm, its diameter between 34–42 mm. The rather thin, umbilicate shell has a strictly conical shape. It is light olivaceous or pale corneous. The spire is conical, with nearly straight outlines. The apex is acute. The sutures are linear. The seven whorls are flattened, encircled by numerous fine lirae, which become obsolete on the lower whorl, which shows usually very ill-defined obliquely descending small folds, at right angles to the incremental striae. The body whorl is acutely angular at the periphery. The base of the shell is flat,
spirally, subobsoletely lirate. The aperture subhorizontal. The outer lip is thin, margined with brown or corneous. The columella is subhorizontal, curved, toothed below the middle, receding above, not spreading around the umbilicus as in some other species of this genus. The umbilicus is funnel-shaped, rapidly becoming very narrow, white within, its edge defined by an angle.

Distribution
This species occurs in the Pacific Ocean off the coast of California, USA.

References

 Turgeon, D.D., et al. 1998. Common and scientific names of aquatic invertebrates of the United States and Canada. American Fisheries Society Special Publication 26 page(s): 61

montereyi
Gastropods described in 1850